Inessa Kaagman (born 17 April 1996) is a Dutch professional footballer who plays as a midfielder for Eredivisie club PSV and the Netherlands national team.

Club career

Ajax
Kaagman joined Ajax in 2013, having spent her youth with Hollandia. She made her senior on 30 August 2013 during a BeNe League draw away to Club Brugge, the first of eighteen appearances during the 2013–14 season. She scored twice in eleven matches in 2014–15, prior to netting four goals in twenty-four matches in the newly reformed Eredivisie. In the following two campaigns, Kaagman scored nine more goals; including her last for Ajax on 6 May 2018 against PEC Zwolle. She won two Eredivisie titles with Ajax.

Everton
On 22 May 2018, Kaagman joined English FA WSL club Everton in a player exchange deal involving Marthe Munsterman. She made her debut for the club on 26 August 2018 in a 1–0 defeat against second-tier side Durham in the League Cup and scored her first Everton goal in the same competition on 16 September in a 3–2 home win against Reading. On 2 December 2018, Kaagman scored from 30 yards in a 2–1 win over Merseyside rivals Liverpool, the first goal scored under new manager Willie Kirk. The strike was voted as the team's goal of the season at the end of the campaign. On 21 May 2020, Kaagman left Everton following the expiration of her contract.

Brighton & Hove Albion
After departing Everton, Kaagman moved across the WSL to sign with Brighton & Hove Albion on 17 July 2020; penning a one-year contract. She scored on her debut against Birmingham City on 6 July 2020.

PSV
After 4 years in England Kaagman moved back to the Netherlands and signed for PSV.

International career
Kaagman represented the Netherlands at youth level, firstly with the U15s. She won nine caps for the U17s in qualification for the UEFA Women's Under-17 Championships between 2012 and 2013. In July 2014, Kaagman was part of the Dutch squad that won the 2014 UEFA Women's Under-19 Championship in Norway, she scored once (vs. Belgium in the groups) They failed to qualify for the 2015 UEFA Women's Under-19 Championship, but Kaagman scored three qualifying goals. Kaagman received a call-up to the seniors for a 2019 World Cup qualifier against Norway in August 2018 but didn't feature.

Kaagman made her senior international debut on 19 January 2019 against South Africa, featuring for the first half of a victory at the Cape Town Stadium in front of 27,000 fans. She was selected for the 2019 FIFA Women's World Cup by manager Sarina Wiegman.

Career statistics

Club
.

International

Honours
Ajax
KNVB Women's Cup: 2013–14, 2016–17
Eredivisie: 2016–17, 2017–18
Netherlands U19
UEFA Women's Under-19 Championship: 2014
Individual
Ajax Talent of the Year: 2014–15

References

External links

1996 births
Living people
People from Hoorn
Women's association football midfielders
Dutch women's footballers
Netherlands women's international footballers
BeNe League players
Eredivisie (women) players
Women's Super League players
AFC Ajax (women) players
Everton F.C. (women) players
Brighton & Hove Albion W.F.C. players
PSV (women) players
2019 FIFA Women's World Cup players
Footballers at the 2020 Summer Olympics
Olympic footballers of the Netherlands
Dutch expatriate women's footballers
Expatriate women's footballers in England
Dutch expatriate sportspeople in England
Footballers from North Holland